Don Pedro Reservoir, also known as Lake Don Pedro, is a reservoir formed by the construction of the New Don Pedro Dam across the Tuolumne River in Tuolumne County, California, United States.

The California Office of Environmental Health Hazard Assessment has issued a safety advisory for any fish caught in Don Pedro Reservoir due to elevated levels of mercury and PCBs.

Geography

The reservoir is located in the foothills of the Sierra Nevada. Communities located nearby are Moccasin and La Grange.   It is the sixth-largest reservoir in California.
 
Also referenced as Don Pedro Lake when the name is qualified, the first projects in 1923 are generally referred to as the Old Don Pedro Dam and reservoir, and the 1971 upgrades are the New Don Pedro Dam and reservoir. Don Pedro Reservoir takes its name from Don Pedros Bar.  Pierre ("Don Pedro") Sainsevain was one of the first prospectors after the discovery of gold in 1848 that began the California Gold Rush.

Some of the water is treated by the MID and used as drinking water in Modesto.

Recreation
The Don Pedro Recreation Area is operated in and around the lake by the Don Pedro Lake Recreation Agency. There are drive-in and boat-in campgrounds, houseboat areas, fishing, water skiing, and mountain biking and hiking trails.

There are three public boat ramps on the shoreline, in the Blue Oaks Area, Moccasin Point Area, and Fleming Meadows Area.

Hetch Hetchy project
While Don Pedro Reservoir is not part of the Hetch Hetchy Aqueduct, the project's tunnels cross under the upper end of the reservoir. The reservoir could easily be tied into the Hetch Hetchy Project in the future, and the efforts of the Restore Hetch Hetchy group to drain the reservoir in the Hetch Hetchy Valley depend largely on that possibility. The San Francisco Public Utilities Commission (SFPUC), of which Hetch Hetchy Water and Power is a division, provided about 45% of the funds for construction of the 1971 New Don Pedro Dam and so has the right to store  of water in the reservoir. The rights of the MID and the TID are senior to those of SFPUC, however, so in dry years MID and TID can draw down the reservoir to meet their own needs before providing water to San Francisco's Hetch Hetchy Water and Power.

See also
List of dams and reservoirs in California
List of largest reservoirs of California

References

External links

Official Don Pedro Lake Recreation Agency website
Don Pedro Lake Recreation Agency: Don Pedro Recreation Area access + recreation facilities Map
Turlock Irrigation District
Modesto Irrigation District
Virtualguidebooks.com: "The Highway 49/120 Bridge over Don Pedro Reservoir"

Reservoirs in Tuolumne County, California
Tuolumne River
Lakes of the Sierra Nevada (United States)
Parks in Tuolumne County, California
Protected areas of the Sierra Nevada (United States)
Campgrounds in California
Reservoirs in Northern California

de:New-Don-Pedro-Talsperre